Class 143 may refer to:

Albatros-class fast attack craft, also known as Type 143
British Rail Class 143
DR Class 243, also known as Class 143